John Ellis (9 May 1890 – 26 July 1974) was an Australian cricketer. He played 101 first-class cricket matches for Victoria between 1918 and 1930.

See also
 List of Victoria first-class cricketers

References

External links
 

1890 births
1974 deaths
Australian cricketers
Victoria cricketers
Cricketers from Melbourne